Nepal Socialist Party may refer to:
 Socialist Party of Nepal
 Nepali Congress
 Communist Party of Nepal (Unified Socialist)
 People's Socialist Party, Nepal
 Democratic Socialist Party (Nepal)